Robert Mösching (born 23 November 1954) is a Swiss former ski jumper. He competed at the 1976 Winter Olympics and the 1980 Winter Olympics.

References

External links

1954 births
Living people
Swiss male ski jumpers
Olympic ski jumpers of Switzerland
Ski jumpers at the 1976 Winter Olympics
Ski jumpers at the 1980 Winter Olympics